Susini is a surname. Notable people with the surname include:

Annick de Susini (born 1960), French swimmer
Clemente Susini (1754–1814), Italian sculptor
Enrique Telémaco Susini (1891-1972), Argentine media entrepreneur
Giovanni Francesco Susini (c.1585 – c. 1653), Italian sculptor
Jean-Jacques Susini (1933–2017), French political figure
Laurent Susini (born 1965), French molecular biologist
Telémaco Susini (1856–1936), Argentinian physician